A flashlight is a portable self-contained electric spotlight, also known as a torch.

Flashlight or flash light or Flash Light may also refer to:

Flash (photography), or the flashlight, a device used for instantaneous illumination during picture taking
Flashlight fish (disambiguation), a common name for several fishes
The photophore, beside the eye of certain fish
Yakovlev Yak-25, a Soviet military jet which NATO designates as "Flashlight"
Yakovlev Yak-27, NATO designation "Flashlight-C"
The Flashlight, a 1917 silent film starring Lon Chaney, Sr.
"Flashlight" (MacGyver), an episode of MacGyver

Music

Albums 
Flash Light (album), a 1987 album by Tom Verlaine
Flashlights (album), a 2007 album by the band Y-O-U

Songs 
"Flash Light" (song), a 1977 song by Parliament
"Flashlight" (DJ Fresh song), a 2014 song by DJ Fresh featuring Ellie Goulding
"Flashlight" (R3hab and Deorro song), a 2014 single by Dutch DJ R3hab and Mexican-American DJ Deorro
"Flashlight" (Jessie J song), a song recorded for the soundtrack to the film Pitch Perfect 2 (2015)
"Flashlight" (Kasia Moś song), a 2017 song by Kasia Moś
"Flashlight", a song by Hunter Hayes from Storyline
"Flashlight", a 1994 single by Fuzzy
"Flashlight", a song by The Front Bottoms from The Front Bottoms	
"Flashlight", a song by Chris Young from Neon

See also
Flash Lite, a lightweight version of Adobe Flash Player
Flash (disambiguation)
Fleshlight, a sex toy for men
Torch (disambiguation)